Christen Kelley (November 7, 1978 – October 2, 2017), better known by his stage name Slip Capone,
was an American rapper and member of DPGC from Hawthorne, California, California.

Early life
Slip Capone was born on November 7, 1978. He grew up on 118th street in Hawthorne California.
He is half British and half African American and is commonly referred to as “The Mayor of Hawthorne".
Christen Kelley was signed to Death Row Records in the mid 90's when he was 14 years old.
He then went on to appear on Kurupt’s solo debut album Kuruption! on a song called "Survive Another Day" by Kurupt featuring Gonzo and himself.

Early career 
During his teenage years, Slip Capone met rapper Snoop Dogg through Kurupt of the Dogg Pound. Proving himself with his rapping skills, his first appearance was on Snoop Dogg’s multiplatinum Murder Was the Case soundtrack with a song called "The Eulogy" by Slip Capone & CPO Boss Hogg.

In the United States, on the chart dated November 5, 1994, Murder Was the Case debuted on the Billboard 200 at number one, with first week sales of 329,000 units. The album opened at the top spot of the R&B/Hip-Hop Albums chart.

The following week it stayed on top with 197,000 copies sold and was certified Gold. The album is certified 2× platinum with 2,030,000 copies sold.

Death
Kelley died on October 2, 2017, of serious health complications after laying in a coma on life support.

Discography

Guest appearances
1994
 Slip Capone & CPO - The Eulogy (" Murder was the Case") Soundtrack1998
 Kurupt, Tray Deee, Daz Dillinger, Slip Capone - C-Walk1998
 Kurupt feat. Slip Capone - Another Day
2000
 Slip Capone - Movin around' prod Daz Dillinger2001
 DPG feat. Slip Capone - My Heart Don't Pump No Fear
2002
 Knoc-turn’al feat. Butch Cassidy, Jayo Felony , Slip Capone & Time Bomb - Let's All Roll
2002
 Knoc-turn’al feat. Too $hort & Slip Capone - Cash Sniffin’ Noses'
2010
 Slip Capone - U can't fuck with prod Ill Slim Collin
2014
 Slip Capone feat. Nate Dogg - Mind On My Money
2016
 Philly Swain feat.Schoolboy Q'' & Slip Capone - Gangsta Cinema

Studio albums
 Caponey Boy (2009)
 Greatest Features (2009)
 Kill the Industry (2010)

References

 Slip Capone
 Murder Was the Case
 
 
 Slip Capone
 
 Various - Murder Was The Case (The Soundtrack)
 Slip Capone | DubCNN.com // West Coast Hip-Hop : Daily For Over A Decade
 R.I.P. Slip Capone
 Filmmusik: Murder Was The Case (LP) – jpc
 
 R.I.P. Slip Capone

1978 births
2017 deaths
21st-century American male musicians
African-American male rappers
Crips
Death Row Records artists
G-funk artists
Musicians from Hawthorne, California
Rappers from California
West Coast hip hop musicians